Pinnacle Industries LTD also known as PIL is an Indian motor vehicle and interior manufacturing company based in Pune, Maharashtra. The company was incorporated in June 27, 1996 in the industrial city of Pithampur, located in the of Madhya Pradesh, India. The company designs and develops seating and interior products for commercial vehicles in India. Dr. Sudhir Mehta is the founder of Pinnacle Industries.

History 
Pinnacle Industries Limited was incorporated on 27 June 1996. Pinnacle Industries Limited's Annual General Meeting (AGM) was last held on 30 November 2021 and as per records from Ministry of Corporate Affairs (MCA), its balance sheet was last filed on 31 March 2021. It is classified as Non-govt company and is registered in Pune. Its authorized share capital is Rs. 170,000,000 and its paid up capital is Rs. 148,251,728. It is involved in sale of motor vehicle parts and accessories.

In September 2021, the government announced the PLI scheme for the auto sector, offering Rs 26,058 crore in incentives along with 12 other manufacturing sectors. Pinnacle Industries to invest Rs 2,000 crore to set up EV manufacturing units in Pune, Indore.

Operations 
Pinnacle Industries makes seats and interior products for commercial vehicles. PIL is currently manufacturing Electric Vehicles in India along with its subsidiary company EKA mobility. The company introduced neonatal ambulances developed for the Maharashtra Government. These Ambulances are equipped with all medical facilities and technologies to deliver medical care to newborns. On 8th July 2022, the company supplied 466 ambulances to the Department of Health, Bihar Government.  The vehicles were inaugurated and flagged off at the hands of the Chief Minister of Bihar, Nitish Kumar.

References

External Links 
Pinnacle Industries at Bloomberg

Automotive companies established in 1997
Automotive industry in India